Edoardo Vera (1821–1889) was an Italian opera composer.

Works

Operas
Anelda da Messina
Valeria: lyric tragedy in four acts to a libretto by Antonio Ghislanzoni – 1869
Adriana Lecouvreur e la duchessa di Bouillon: (on the same subject as Adriana Lecouvreur) lyric drama in 4 acts to a libretto by Achille de Lauzières – 1856

Songs
"L'ombre"
"La tradita"
"Mescetimi il vin"

References

1821 births
1889 deaths
19th-century classical composers
19th-century Italian composers
Italian classical composers
Italian male classical composers
Italian opera composers
Male opera composers
19th-century Italian male musicians